Crax is a genus of curassows in the order Galliformes, a clade of large, heavy-bodied, ground-feeding birds. They are known from tropical South America with one species, the great curassow, ranging northwards through Central America as far as Mexico. The curassows in this genus are noted for their sexual dimorphism; males are more boldly coloured than females and have facial ornamentation such as knobs and wattles. They are also characterised by curly crests and contrastingly-coloured crissums (the area around the cloaca). Crax curassows probably originated as a distinct lineage during the Late Miocene. During the Messinian, the ancestral Crax split into two lineages separated by the Colombian Andes and the Cordillera de Mérida which uplifted at that time. The northern lineage radiated into the great, blue-billed, and yellow-knobbed curassows, while the four southern species evolved as they became separated by the uplifting of various mountain ranges.

Characteristics
The variety of male bill ornament shapes and colors is typical for this genus, as is a curly crest and a contrasting white or rufous crissum. Crax species, even distantly related, readily hybridize, with fertile offspring theoretically possible in all possible mating combinations

Taxonomy
The genus Crax was introduced in 1758 by the Swedish naturalist Carl Linnaeus in the tenth edition of his Systema Naturae. The genus name may be based on the Ancient Greek 
κρας, kras  meaning "head". The type species was designated as the great curassow (Crax rubra) in 1897 by the American ornithologist Robert Ridgway.

Species
The genus contains 7 species:

This genus forms one of the two major lineages of curassows. It is distinguishable from its relatives by its pronounced sexual dimorphism (with the exception of the black curassow). In other genera sexual dimorphism is rarely exhibited or of minor appearance (Nothocrax and Pauxi), or manifest by size only (Mitu).

Evolution
Crax curassows probably originated as a distinct lineage during the Tortonian (Late Miocene), some 10-9 mya, in the western or northwestern Amazonas basin, as indicated by mt and nDNA sequence data calibrated against geological events (Pereira & Baker 2004, Pereira et al. 2002). Some 6 mya during the Messinian, the ancestral Crax split into two lineages which are separated by the Colombian Andes and the Cordillera de Mérida which were uplifted around that time, and the Orinoco which consequently assumed its present-day basin.

The northern lineage quite soon thereafter radiated into the ancestors of the great, blue-billed, and yellow-knobbed curassows, which were isolated from each other by the uplift of the northern Cordillera Occidental, and the Serranía del Perijá, respectively; it is fairly certain that these lineages were well distinct by the end of the Miocene. (Pereira & Baker 2004)

The evolution of the 4 southern species was somewhat more complex. In the Messinian, about 6–5.5 mya, the ancestors of the wattled curassow became isolated in the western Amazonas basin. With increasing aridification of southeastern Brazil, the ancestors of the red-billed curassow found refuge in the mountain ranges between the Brazilian Highlands and the Atlantic during the mid-Zanclean, some 4.5-4 mya. The divergence between the bare-faced and black curassow lineages apparently took place around the Uquian–Ensenadan boundary, some 1.5 mya. This which coincides with one or several period(s) of elevated sea levels during which the lower Amazonas basin was a brackish lagoon which offered little curassow habitat. Their present ranges are consequently still separated by the Amazonas river. (Pereira & Baker 2004)

References

Sources
Pereira, Sérgio Luiz & Baker, Allan J. (2004): Vicariant speciation of curassows (Aves, Cracidae): a hypothesis based on mitochondrial DNA phylogeny. Auk 121(3): 682–694. [English with Spanish abstract] DOI:10.1642/0004-8038(2004)121[0682:VSOCAC]2.0.CO;2 HTML abstract HTML fulltext without images
Pereira, Sérgio Luiz; Baker, Allan J.& Wajntal, Anita (2002): Combined nuclear and mitochondrial DNA sequences resolve generic relationships within the Cracidae (Galliformes, Aves). Systematic Biology 51(6): 946–958.   PDF fulltext

 
Curassows
Bird genera
Extant Tortonian first appearances